The Kildare County Board of the Gaelic Athletic Association (GAA), or Kildare GAA, is one of 12 county boards governed by the Leinster provincial council of the GAA in Ireland, and is responsible for the administration of Gaelic games in County Kildare 

The County Board is responsible for preparing the Kildare county teams in the various Gaelic sporting codes; football, hurling and camogie.

The county football team won the All-Ireland Senior Football Championship (SFC) on four occasions in less than 25 years at the beginning of the 20th century and had accumulated ten Leinster Senior Football Championships by 1935; however, it then went into decline. It last reached an All-Ireland SFC final in 1998 after a gap of 63 years without an appearance in the decider.

Colours and crest

The Kildare crest had a serpent on it until 1993, reflecting that of Kildare County Council, itself based on the crest for the town of Naas. When Kildare County Council had the Heraldic Office of Ireland create a proper crest in 1991, and with Kildare fans regarding the serpent as a bad omen, the Kildare Supporters' Club requested a new one for their county teams; this featured acorns above a bunch of lilies (the county council one differed in that it had a Brigid's cross, a harp, a horse's head and acorns). Kildare still lost in the first round of the Leinster Senior Football Championship (SFC) for three years afterwards, from 1994 until 1996.

History
Gaelic games predate recorded sporting history in Kildare. Hurling on Lyons Hill was featured in the Book of Leinster. The Curragh of Kildare was the venue for the fairs and festivals of ancient Ireland called the Aonach Colmáin. Local references to football go back to medieval times. An English traveller, John Dundon, described a hurling match in Naas in 1699. A handball alley near Rathangan bears the date 1790, though the oldest known alley is located near Moone. A match at Timolin in February 1792, resulted in a riot that was reported in local newspapers. There is also a reference to an inter-county match between Kildare and Meath GAA in 1797 which was attended by Lord Edward Fitzgerald. Valentine Lawless, Lord of Cloncurry, describes how Wogan Browne, an 18th-century grandee, lost his Justice of the Peace status for kicking off a football match in the Clane area, also in 1797.

Summer athletics meetings in Kildare predate the GAA. John Wyse Power, then editor of local newspaper The Leinster Leader, attended the foundation meeting of the Gaelic Athletic Association (GAA) in Thurles in 1884. In February 1885, Sallins GAA, Straffan GAA, Naas GAA and the Suncroft GAA played in the first four football matches governed under new GAA rules.

A county committee was established in 1887. Kildare entered the second championships in 1888 and was represented by Clane GAA. Tommy Conneff from Clane, who went on to hold the world record for the mile, was among the first GAA athletic champions.

County board structure
The Kildare County Board, which meets once a month in St Conleth's Park, is the highest authority within the county. It is responsible for running all adult football competitions, the Under 21 championships, and minor leagues and championships. Every club sends one delegate. There is a separate board responsible for hurling, which is a subsidiary board to the county board.

Juvenile hurling and football is administered by Bord na nÓg which runs Under 14, 15 and 16 competitions.  Under 13 and younger grades are separated into a North Board and South Board.

The current Kildare county board is structured as follows: 
Chairman: 
Vice-Chair: John McMahon (Naas)
Full-time secretary: Kathleen O'Neill (Rathcoffey) 
PRO: Mary Donnelly (Round Towers) 
Treasurer: Martin Whyte (Kilcullen) 
Oifigeach Gaeilge: Peadar O Murchu (St. Laurence's) 
Hurling Chairman: Eddie Lawlor (Athy)

Football

Clubs

Kildare is very much a footballing county, with 105 teams from 45 clubs competing in the Senior and Junior Football Leagues. The highest-achieving club is Sarsfields (Newbridge) with 25 (9 as their former name Roseberry). Clane won 17 titles. Raheens won 10; Carbury, 11; Round Towers from Kildare Town, 10 (counting three won as Kildare Town and one as St Patrick's); Naas, 9; Moorefield (Newbridge), 8; Athy, 5; Kilcock, 5; Ellistown, 4 (counting 2 won as Mountrice); Johnstownbridge, 3; Caragh, 3; Monasterevin, 3; Maynooth, 2; and Allenwood, Ardclough, Ballymore, Celbridge, Curragh, Eadestown, Military College, Rathangan, Newbridge CYMS club St Conleth's (on objection) and St Laurence's won one each. Raheens and Moorefield are the only Kildare sides to win a Leinster club title (in 1981 and 2006 and Moorefield again in 2017

Kildare Senior Football Championship Finals
(year, winner, score, defeated finalists, score, venue)
1888 Clane 0–4 Naas 0–0 Naas
1889 Mountrice Blunts 0–2 Kildare 0–1 Kildare
1890 Monasterevin 1–3 Clane 1–2 Milltown
1891 Mountrice Blunts 1–4 Kildare 0–1 Monasterevin
1892 Clane 0–3 Kilcullen 0–2
1894 Void
1895 Clane 0–7 Maynooth 0–1 Sallins
1896 Maynooth 7–9 Sallins 0–3 Clane
1897 Clane beat Maynooth
1898 Void
1899 Void
1900 Void
1901 Clane 4–15 Prosperous 0–3 Maynooth
1902 Clane 4–7 Moorefield 2–3 Roseberry (Newbridge)
1903 Clane 1–10 Prosperous 0–7 Clane
1904 Roseberry (Newbridge) 0–14 Naas 0–3 Clane
1905 Roseberry (Newbridge) 0–10 Clane 0–6 Clane
1906 Roseberry (Newbridge) 1–11 Clane 1–2 Celbridge
1907 Roseberry (Newbridge) 0–7 Monasterevin 0–3 Athy
1908 Roseberry (Newbridge) beat Allen
1909 Roseberry (Newbridge) 0–4 Clane 0–1 Athy
1910 Roseberry (Newbridge) 1–3 Monasterevin 1–1 Athy
1911 Monasterevin 2–1 Roseberry (Newbridge) 0–2 Kildare
1912 Roseberry (Newbridge) 2–6 Monasterevin 1–2 Athy
1913 Maynooth 2–1 Kilcock 1–1 Clane
1914 Kilcock 1–4 Clane 0–4 Celbridge
1915 Roseberry (Newbridge) 0–6 Maynooth 1–0 Naas
1916 Clane 2–2 Maynooth 0–2 Naas
1917 Kilcock 5–0 Kilcullen 0–5 Naas
1918 Caragh 2–2 Roseberry (Newbridge) 0–5 Naas
1919 Caragh 2–4 Kilcock 2–1 Naas
1920 Naas 1–6 Caragh 0–8 St Conleth's Park
1921 St Conleth's 1–2 Caragh 1–12 St Conleth's Park
(Match played during Irish Civil War, St Conleth's awarded title on objection because one of the Caragh players C. McCarthy gave a false name as he was 'on the run' from Free State troops at the time)
1922 Naas 1–8 Caragh 1–3 Newbridge
1923 Naas 2–5 Athy 0–0 St Conleth's Park
1924 Naas 1–1 Kildare 0–4 St Conleth's Park
Replay Naas 1–2 Kildare 0–3 St Conleth's Park
1925 Rathangan 2–4 Caragh 1–3 Naas
1926 Caragh 3–4 Athy 3–3 Kildare
1927 Kildare 2–6 Athy 1–5 St Conleth's Park
1928 Naas 3–3 Rathangan 2–4 St Conleth's Park
1929 Kildare 3–2 Naas 1–2 St Conleth's Park
1930 Kildare 2–4 Naas 0–5 St Conleth's Park
1931 Naas 6–7 Round Towers Kildare 0–3 St Conleth's Park
1932 Naas 0–10 Curragh 0–9 St Conleth's Park
1933 Athy 2–6 Rathangan 1–4 St Conleth's Park
1934 Athy 1–3 Raheens 0–6 St Conleth's Park
Replay Athy 2–6 Raheens 1–4 St Conleth's Park
1935 Raheens 6–3 St. Brigid's Kildare 1–0 St Conleth's Park
1936 Raheens 1–7 McDonaghs 1–6 St Conleth's Park
1937 Athy 3–6 Sarsfields (Newbridge) 1–6 Naas
1938 St Patrick's Kildare w.o. Ellistown St Conleth's Park
1939 Ellistown 3–2 St. Patrick's Kildare 1–3 St Conleth's Park
1940 Carbury 1–5 Kilcock 0–4 Naas
1941 Carbury 1–9 Athy 0–6 St Conleth's Park
1942 Athy 0–6 Carbury 0–6 St Conleth's Park
Replay Athy 1–6 Carbury 0–6 St Conleth's Park
1943 Raheens 1–3 Ellistown 1–3 St Conleth's Park
Replay Raheens 1–1 Ellistown 1–1 St Conleth's Park
Replay Raheens 1–4 Ellistown 1–2 St Conleth's Park
1944 Ellistown 1–4 Carbury 0–4 St Conleth's Park
1945 Sarsfields (Newbridge) 2–9 Raheens 1–5 St Conleth's Park
1946 Carbury 0–11 Athy 0–7 St Conleth's Park
1947 Sarsfields (Newbridge) 1–7 Curragh 1–5 St Conleth's Park
1948 Curragh 2–7 Sarsfields (Newbridge) 2–4 St Conleth's Park
1949 Ardclough 1–8 Curragh 1–8 St Conleth's Park
Replay Ardclough 1–11 Curragh 2–6 St Conleth's Park
1950 Sarsfields (Newbridge) 1–9 Carbury 2–3 St Conleth's Park
1951 Sarsfields (Newbridge) 2–11 North Division 1–7 St Conleth's Park
1952 Sarsfields (Newbridge) 2–6 Carbury 0–4 Naas
1953 Ballymore 1–6 Carbury 1–5 St Conleth's Park
1954 Round Towers (Kildare) 0–3 Carbury 0–2 St Conleth's Park
1955 Kilcock 3–13 Sarsfields (Newbridge) 4–10 Naas
Replay Kilcock 0–9 Sarsfields (Newbridge) 1–4 St Conleth's Park
1956 Military College l-6 Ballymore 0–4 St Conleth's Park
1957 Kilcock 1–6 Round Towers Kildare 1–5 Naas
1958 Kilcock 3–12 Round Towers Kildare 3–8 St Conleth's Park
1959 Round Towers (Kildare) 5–5 Clane 0–7 St Conleth's Park
1960 Carbury 2–9 Round Towers Kildare 0–5 St Conleth's Park
1961 Round Towers (Kildare) 3–8 Carbury 1–11 St Conleth's Park
1962 Moorefield (Newbridge) 2–11 Kilcullen 0–2 St Conleth's Park
1963 Clane 1–8 Round Towers Kildare 2–1 St Conleth's Park
1964 Raheens 3–10 Clane 1–9 St Conleth's Park
1965 Carbury 3–13 Moorefield 1–9 St Conleth's Park
1966 Carbury 2–14 Raheens 0–7 St Conleth's Park
1967 Clane 4–6 Carbury 1–9 St Conleth's Park
1968 Raheens 2–7 Carbury 1–8 St Conleth's Park
1969 Carbury 0–10 Clane 0–7 St Conleth's Park
1970 Eadestown1–9 Carbury 0–10 St Conleth's Park
1971 Carbury 1–13 Allenwood 1–8 St Conleth's Park
1972 Carbury 3–14 Ellistown 1–7 St Conleth's Park
1973 Raheens 1–7 Monasterevin 0–4 St Conleth's Park
1974 Carbury 2–9 Ballyteague 0–5 St Conleth's Park
1975 Clane 1–6 Carbury 0–9 St Conleth's Park
Replay Clane 2–7 Carbury 1–6 St Conleth's Park
1976 Raheens 2–5 Monasterevin 0–6 St Conleth's Park
1977 Monasterevin 2–8 Carbury 2–6 St Conleth's Park
1978 Raheens 3–14 Athy 2–6 St Conleth's Park
1979 Raheens 0–15 Carbury 0–10 St Conleth's Park
1980 Clane 1–7 Raheens 1–6 St Conleth's Park
1981 Raheens 2–9 Sarsfields (Newbridge) 1–7 St Conleth's Park
1982 Sarsfields (Newbridge) 2–11 St. Laurence's 0–4 St Conleth's Park
1983 Johnstownbridge 2–7 Sarsfields (Newbridge) 1–8 St Conleth's Park
1984 Clane 1–9 Carbury 0–8 St Conleth's Park
1985 Carbury 1–9 Raheens 0–5 St Conleth's Park
1986 Sarsfields (Newbridge) 0–11 Leixlip 0–8 St Conleth's Park
1987 Athy 2–9 Johnstownbridge 0–9 St Conleth's Park
1988 Johnstownbridge 0–10 Carbury 0–10 St Conleth's Park
Replay Johnstownbridge 1–10 Carbury 1–8 St Conleth's Park
1989 Johnstownbridge 1–7 Clane 1–5 St Conleth's Park
1990 Naas 1–14 Clane 2–9 St Conleth's Park
1991 Clane 2–10 Naas 1–6 St Conleth's Park
1992 Clane 0–9 St. Laurence's 0–7 St Conleth's Park
1993 Sarsfields (Newbridge) 0–11 Clane 0–11 St Conleth's Park
Replay Sarsfields (Newbridge) 1–16 Clane 0–15 St Conleth's Park
1994 Sarsfields (Newbridge) 2–15 Johnstownbridge 0–9 St Conleth's Park
1995 Clane 3–17 Athy 1–8 St Conleth's Park
1996 Round Towers (Kildare) 1–13 Johnstownbridge 0–10 St Conleth's Park
1997 Clane 0–13 Sarsfields (Newbridge) 0–8 St Conleth's Park
1998 Round Towers (Kildare) 2–8 Clane 0–4 St Conleth's Park
1999 Sarsfields (Newbridge) 0–15 Allenwood 1–5 St Conleth's Park
2000 Moorefield (Newbridge) 2–13 Kilcock 2–7 St Conleth's Park
2001 Sarsfields (Newbridge) 0–10 Moorefield 0–8 St Conleth's Park
2002 Moorefield (Newbridge) 1–8 Sarsfields (Newbridge) 0–7 St Conleth's Park
2003 Round Towers (Kildare) 2–14 Kilcock 1–9 St Conleth's Park
2004 Allenwood 0–11 St Laurence's 0–7 St Conleth's Park
2005 Sarsfields (Newbridge) 0–11 St Laurence's 1–8 St Conleth's Park
Replay Sarsfields (Newbridge) 1–11 St Laurence's 0–9 St Conleth's Park
2006 Moorefield (Newbridge) 0–10 Allenwood 0–9 St Conleth's Park
2007 Moorefield (Newbridge) 2–9 Sarsfields (Newbridge) 0–11 St Conleth's Park
2008 Celbridge 0–7 Sarsfields (Newbridge) 0–7 St Conleth's Park
Replay Celbridge 1–9 Sarsfields (Newbridge) 0–10 St Conleth's Park
2009 St Laurence's 1–13 Moorefield (Newbridge) 0–6 St Conleth's Park
2010 Moorefield (Newbridge) 0–13 Sarsfields (Newbridge) 1–8 St Conleth's Park
2011 Athy 2–11 Carbury 2-7
2012 Sarsfields (Newbridge) 2–11 Carbury 0-11
2013 Moorefield (Newbridge) 2–14 Sarsfields (Newbridge) 0–13 St Conleth's Park
2014 Moorefield (Newbridge) 0–16 Sarsfields (Newbridge) 1–13 St Conleth's Park
Replay Moorefield (Newbridge) 1–15 Sarsfields (Newbridge) 1–6 St Conleth's Park
2015 Sarsfields (Newbridge) 0–17 Athy 1–12 St Conleth's Park
2016 Sarsfields (Newbridge) 2–13 Moorefield (Newbridge) 0–15 St Conleth's Park
2017 Moorefield (Newbridge) 0–11 Celbridge 0–9 St Conleth's Park
2018 Moorefield (Newbridge) 2–12 Athy 2–09 St Conleth's Park
2019 Sarsfields (Newbridge) 0–15 Moorefield (Newbridge) 2–09 St Conleth's Park
Replay Sarsfields (Newbridge) 2–15 Moorefield (Newbridge) 2–09 St Conleth's Park

County team

Kildare first entered the All-Ireland Senior Football Championship in 1888, and lost to Dublin by a score of 2–7 to 0–1.

Kildare made a major contribution towards the evolution of rules and tactics in Gaelic football. The county was the first to abandon the tradition of playing 21 people on each team, using 16 on each team for a period. Kildare players invented the hand pass: a polished team tactic since 1903;  The toe-to-hand was pioneered by the Roseberry (now Newbridge Sarsfields) club. A team made up of players from the two strongest clubs in the county, Roseberry and Clane, played Kerry three times for the All-Ireland Championship of 1903; the matches drew the first mass interest in a field sport in the country, had an aggregate attendance of 50,000, and were regarded as the games which "made the GAA."

Kildare's four All-Ireland titles were won between 1905 and 1928: over Kerry in 1905, Galway in 1919, and Kerry again in the 1927  final and Cavan in the 1928 final. Kildare became the first team to win the Sam Maguire Cup in 1928. They haven't won it since.

Tactics such as the hand pass were perfected by those early Kildare teams, but they also developed what became traditional catch-and-kick football. Olympic high jumper Larry Stanley was regarded as one of the greatest fielders in the history of the game, and first winner of the all-time All Star award.

Despite winning a Leinster Senior Football Championship in 1956, reaching the National League final in 1958 and 1968, and winning the All-Ireland Under-21 Football Championship in 1965, Kildare footballers seemed to have difficulty maintaining their proud tradition. The county lost six Leinster finals in the twelve years between 1966 and 1978. Although the Raheens club won a Leinster Senior Club Football Championship title in 1983.

In 1991, former Kerry manager Mick O'Dwyer took charge of the county football team. Kildare lost two more Leinster finals to Dublin in 1992 and 1993, as well as the National League final of 1991. When Dublin came back for a draw in 1994 and won the replay, O'Dwyer was succeeded by Dermot Earley Snr for two years. He returned in 1997, and guided the county to victory over Laois with 13 players and a dramatic, twice replayed series of matches with Meath (which they lost) that captured the imagination of the public and steeled the side for further honors.

In 1998, the Kildare team became the only team in 110 years of championship football to beat the previous three champions, Dublin, Meath and Kerry in turn only to lose to Galway in the All-Ireland final; despite leading by three points at half time. Another Leinster followed in 2000, but Galway defeated them in the semi-final. Leinster Final defeats followed in 2002 and 2003, against Dublin and a Laois side back-boned by their All-Ireland MFC winning sides of the late 1990s. In (2005), Kildare enjoyed mixed success and finished in the top six in the National Football League, but was knocked out of the championship by Sligo.

In 2008 under the new management of Kieran McGeeney Kildare made a bit of unfortunate history by becoming the first team ever to lose a championship game to Wicklow in Croke Park, losing in the first round by 0–13 to 0–9. However Kildares season took a turn for the better after that by beating Cavan, Limerick and Fermanagh in the all- Ireland qualifiers to reach their first ever all-Ireland quarter-final. To date in 2009, an improved Kildare side reached the Leinster Final only to suffer a defeat to Dublin. Kildare advanced to the All-Ireland quarter-final to play then All-Ireland champions Tyrone after beating Wicklow only to be knocked out by Tyrone. 2010 saw Kildare lose to Louth in the 2nd round. However Kildare had a great run through the qualifiers beating teams like Antrim, Leitrim, Derry and Monaghan to once again reach the All-Ireland Quarter-final to face Leinster champions Meath which they got a slow start but enjoyed the 2nd half as they ran out winning 2–17 to 1–12. to reach the All-Semi-final for the first time since 2000. On 29 August 2010 Kildare faced Down for the first time ever in the championship which turned out to be a very tense game but Down ran out winners 1–16 to 1–14 after a very frantic finish. 2011 saw Kildare advance to the Leinster semi-final after defeating Meath in the Leinster quarter-final only to be defeated by Dublin. Kildare had a good run in the qualifiers beating teams like Laois, Meath & Derry to advance to the All-Ireland quarter-final to face Ulster champions Donegal which turned to be a very poor performance but the 2nd half was a real contest from both sides with the sides finishing level to drag the game into extra-time only to be defeated by a single point by Donegal. Then in 2015 Cian O'Neill became manager after being with kerry gaa backroom . In 2017 kildare reached their first leinster final in 10 years . Only losing to dublin gaa by 9 points (Dublin 2-23 Kildare 1-17) .

Hurling

Clubs

In recent years, the leading clubs have been Coill Dubh, Éire Óg/Corra Coill, Ardclough and Celbridge.  Kildare's youngest club, Confey, became the reigning Senior Hurling Championship in 2007, winning over Coill Dubh in the final.

Ardclough beat Buffer's Alley in the 1976 Leinster club championship, following Ardclough player Johnny Walsh's replacement All Star award for his county heroics earlier that year (see below).

County team

Kildare hurlers came within minutes of reaching a Leinster Senior Hurling Championship (SHC) final in 1976, holding a four-point lead over eventual All-Ireland SHC finalists Wexford until the closing stages of the semi-final. That performance earned Johnny Walsh a replacement All Star award.

The county's major hurling successes were four All-Ireland Senior B titles (last in 2004), an intermediate All-Ireland (1969), and two junior All-Irelands (1962 and 1966). The closest it came to playing in the top division of the National Hurling League was when it lost a four-point lead in the last ten minutes of a Division 1B promotion play-off against Clare in 1971. Kildare defeated Waterford in the league in two successive years, was tied at half-time against Tipperary in the 1971 National League quarter-final, and lost to the same team by six points in the quarter-final of 1976. Kildare also lost a promotion play-off against Waterford in 1974.

In the 21st-century, Kildare won four Christy Ring Cups: in 2014, 2018, 2020 and 2022.

Camogie

Camogie was played in Kildare since the sport was first organised in 1904, although records are sparse. Athy Ladies Hurling Club advertised a members reunion in July 1909. Newbridge, Naas, Blacktrench, Prosperous and Ballymore applied unsuccessfully for affiliation to Kildare GAA board in 1921. Kildare sent delegates to the camogie congress of 1932, and a county board was formed in 1934 with Fr Byrne CC of Caragh as president, Mrs B McCarthy as vice-president, William Fisher of Newbridge as secretary, and Polly Smyth of Newbridge as treasurer. Camogie was reorganized at a county convention in 1954, and has been played in Kildare continuously since.

Kildare's contested the All-Ireland Senior Camogie Championship semi-final in 1933 and contested the Leinster Senior final in 1939 (which was hosted in Kill), and 1947 at Inchicore. They last competed in the senior championship in 1992 and 1993.

After a series of successes at the junior level, Kildare was defeated by Cork in the National League semi-final of 1992, despite their best performance at senior level. Kildare teams played in navy and white (1930s), brown and white (1955–60) and blue and white (sporadically since the 1960s). White was adopted as the county color in April 1963.

Kildare won the Nancy Murray Cup in 2010, having previously won the Kay Mills Cup in 1987, 1989 and 1990, their best period in the game. They also won the second division of the National Camogie League in 2004. They had previously won the second division title in 1986, 1989 and 1990. Kildare contested senior finals in the Leinster championship, notably in 1939, and Ardclough contested the Leinster senior club final in 1968.

Notable players include Broadford players Miriam Malone, who played from the 1960s to the 1980s and won a Junior Player of the Year award in 1989, Gradam Tailte winner Bernie Farrelly, and scoring forwards Marianne Johnson, and Susie O'Carroll from Celbridge who captained UCD to Ashbourne Cup honours and won a Soaring Star award in 2009. Carbury Johnstownbridge and Celbridge all won divisional camogie honours at Féile na nGael. Joan O'Flynn from Celbridge served as president of the Camogie Association. Gloria Lee refereed the All Ireland senior final of 1963 and John Pender that of 2005.

Under Camogie's National Development Plan 2010–2015, "Our Game, Our Passion", five new camogie clubs were to be established in the county by 2015.

Honours

 4 All-Ireland Junior Camogie Championships
 1987, 1989, 1990, 2013
 1 Nancy Murray Cup
 2010
 4 National Camogie League Division Two (junior) winners
 1986, 1989, 1990, 2004
 2 National Camogie League Division Three winner
 2012, 2019
 1 National Camogie League Division Four winners
 2009
 Once semi-finalists in the National Camogie League National League Division 1
 1992
 Once finalists in the All-Ireland Intermediate Camogie Championship
 1994
 11 Leinster Junior Camogie Championships
 1961, 1966, 1967 (all Smyco cup), 1969, 1981, 1986, 1987, 1988, 1989, 1990, 1996
 2 Leinster Under-14 B Championships
 1997, 2003
 1 Minor Special Blitz 
 2008

Kildare Senior Camogie Championship Roll of Honour
For more details on this topic, see here

Ladies' football
The Kildare Ladies' County Board was set up in March 1992 under the Chairmanship of Catherine Donohoe. At that time there were two clubs playing in the county, Kilcock and Leixlip, and these were joined by the newly formed Eadestown club. Michael Delaney of Leixlip was elected chairman on 10 February 1993.

Kildare's ladies' football is administered by a separate county board structured as follows (2013 Executive); 
Chairman: Arthur Corrigan (Naas) 
Vice-Chair: MJ Smith (Carbury)
Secretary: Gillian Dunne (St Laurences), 
PRO: Jackie Whelan (Castledermot) 
Treasurer: Sharon Dooley(Suncroft)

Honours
Kildare Ladies' won the Leinster Junior championship in 2000, beating Laois by 2–13 to 2–5. Kildare contested three All Ireland junior finals before eventually beating Sligo to qualify for senior status in 2004. Grangenolvin dominated club competition in the sport, in which they won five in a row at the time the championship was elevated to senior status. Brianne Leahy became the first female All Star from Kildare in 1999. In 2015 Kildare took the decision to re-grade to Intermediate level after spending 10 years without success at Senior Level. This brought a new impetus to Kildare Ladies Football where the captured 2 Leinster Intermediate Championships which moving on to win the all Ireland against Clare by a point in 2017. Mary Hulgraine the Kildare goalkeeper was rewarded for her performance by picking up an all-star.

 1 All-Ireland Intermediate Ladies' Football Championship
 2016
 1 All-Ireland Junior Ladies' Football Championship
 2004
 2 All-Ireland Leinster Intermediate Ladies' Football Championship
 2016, 2017

Teams of the Millennium

Football Team of the Millennium
Ollie Crinnigan (Carbury), Matt Goff (Leixlip), Pa Connolly (Clane), Glenn Ryan ([Round Towers GAA|Round Towers]), Jack Higgins Naas, Mick Carolan ([Athy GAA|Athy]), Larry Stanley ([Caragh GAA|Caragh]), Pat Mangan (Carbury), Jack Donnelly (Ellistown), Paddy "Boiler" White ([Sarsfield's GAA (Kildare)|Sarsfields]), Larry Tompkins (Eadestown and Castlehaven Cork), Pat Dunny (Raheens), Tommy Carew ([Clane GAA|Clane]), Paul Doyle Suncroft).

Hurling Team of the Millennium
Jimmy Curran (Castledermot), Tommy Burke (Naomh Bríd), Richard Cullen (Ardclough), Seamus Malone (Coill Dubh), Tommy Christian (Ardclough), Pat Dunny (Éire Og), Tony Carew (Coill Dubh), Bobby Burke (Ardclough), Jack O'Connell (Naomh Bríd), Johnny Walsh (Ardclough), Tommy Carew (Coill Dubh), Pat White (Naomh Bríd), Mick Dwane (Ardclough), Mick Moore (Broadford), Mick Mullins (Éire Og).

Camogie Team of the Century
Anna Dargan (Broadford), Geraldine Dwyer (Athy, Prosperous & Clane), Teresa Lynch (Rathcoffey & Prosperous), Bridget Cushen (Celbridge & Ardclough), Nuala Malone (Rathcoffey & Prosperous), Melanie Treacy (Ballyboden St. Endas, Dublin & Bishopstown, Cork), Phyllis Hurst (Broadford), Miriam Malone (Broadford), Eileen Reilly (Rathcoffey & Prosperous), Michelle Aspell (Kilcullen & St Laurence's), Bernie Farrelly (Crumlin & Broadford), Patricia Keatley (St Laurence's & Broadford), Marianne Johnson (Prosperous & Clane), Clare Monahan (Naas & Two Mile House), Gloria Lee (Naas).

Bibliography
 Kildare GAA: A Centenary History, by Eoghan Corry, CLG Chill Dara, 1984,   hb  pb
 Kildare GAA yearbook, 1972, 1974, 1978, 1979, 1980, 1994 and 2000– in sequence especially the Millennium yearbook of 2000
 Soaring Sliothars, Centenary of Kildare Camogie 1904–2004 by Joan O'Flynn Kildare County Camogie Board.

References

External links

 Kildare GAA Site
 Kildare on Hoganstand.com
 Kildare GAA club sites

 
Gaelic games governing bodies in Leinster
Leinster GAA
Sport in County Kildare